The 2016 Monmouth Hawks football team represented Monmouth University in the 2016 NCAA Division I FCS football season as a member of the Big South Conference. They were led by 24th-year head coach Kevin Callahan and played their home games at Kessler Field. Monmouth finished the season 4–7 overall and 0–5 in Big South play to place sixth.

Schedule

Game summaries

at Lehigh

at Delaware State

at Kent State

Charleston Southern

Fordham

at Howard

at Presbyterian

at Liberty

Kennesaw State

at Coastal Carolina

at Gardner–Webb

References

Monmouth
Monmouth Hawks football seasons
Monmouth Hawks football